Sami Nair (born 23 August 1946, in Tlemcen) is an Algerian-born French political philosopher who coined the term "codevelopment". A specialist on migration movements and their socio-political effects, he advised the government of Lionel Jospin from 1997–1999, and the European Parliament until 2004. Since 2001 he has been vice president of the Citizen and Republican Movement.

References

1946 births
Living people
People from Tlemcen
French philosophers
Algerian emigrants to France
MEPs for France 1999–2004
Citizen and Republican Movement MEPs